Odu (Ơ Đu), or Iduh, is a Mon–Khmer language of Vietnam and Laos. Once spoken by about 300 people in Tương Dương district, Nghệ An province, Vietnam (Đặng, et al. 2010), it is now considered to be almost extinct.

References

Đặng Nghiêm Vạn, Chu Thái Sơn, Lưu Hùng. 2010. Ethnic Minorities in Vietnam. Hà Nội: Thế Giới Publishers.

External links
http://cema.gov.vn/modules.php?name=Content&op=details&mid=523
http://projekt.ht.lu.se/rwaai RWAAI (Repository and Workspace for Austroasiatic Intangible Heritage)
http://hdl.handle.net/10050/00-0000-0000-0003-93EF-1@view Iduh in RWAAI Digital Archive

Khmuic languages
Languages of Vietnam
Languages of Laos